St. George Antiochian Orthodox Cathedral is a cathedral located at Avenida Raúl Scalabrini Ortiz 1261, Buenos Aires, Argentina. It is home to the Antiochian Orthodox Archdiocese of Buenos Aires and All Argentina.

References

Cathedrals in Buenos Aires
Greek Orthodox cathedrals
Greek Orthodox Church of Antioch